Artyom Olegovich Novichonok (born 27 March 1988 in Kondopoga, Soviet Union (now Russia) is a Russian astronomer. Since 2009, the Minor Planet Center credits him with several minor planets, co-discovered in collaboration with astronomers Dmitry Chestnov, Vladimir Gerke and Leonid Elenin at the American Tzec Maun Observatory  in Mayhill, New Mexico, and the Russian Ka-Dar Observatory , TAU Station, in Nizhny Arkhyz, respectively.

He also discovered the periodic comet P/2011 R3 (Novichonok) in 2011, and he was part of the group that discovered the hyperbolic Comet ISON in September 2012, with Vitaly Nevsky at Kondopoga, Russia.

Discoveries

Comets 

Together with Vitali Neveski, he discovered the comets: 
 C/2012 S1 (Comet ISON), a hyperbolic comet
 P/2011 R3 (Novichonok), a Jupiter-family comet

List of discovered minor planets

See also

References

External links 
 (Russian) Official site

1988 births
Living people
21st-century astronomers
Discoverers of minor planets
Discoverers of asteroids
Russian astronomers
People from Kondopoga